Whittemore Township is a township in Kossuth County, Iowa, United States.

History
Whittemore Township was organized in 1885.

References

Townships in Kossuth County, Iowa
Townships in Iowa
1885 establishments in Iowa
Populated places established in 1885